Frederick McDonogh (died 1 December 1955) was an Irish politician. A solicitor, he was elected to Dáil Éireann as a Cumann na nGaedheal Teachta Dála (TD) for the Galway constituency at the 1932 general election, but lost his seat at the 1933 general election.

References

Year of birth missing
1955 deaths
Cumann na nGaedheal TDs
Politicians from County Galway
Members of the 7th Dáil